The Bureau of Indian Affairs (BIA), also known as Indian Affairs (IA), is a United States federal agency within the Department of the Interior. It renders services to roughly 2 million indigenous Americans across 574 federally recognized tribes. The BIA is governed by a director and overseen by the assistant secretary for Indian affairs, who answers to the secretary of the interior.

The BIA works with tribal governments to help administer law enforcement and justice; promote development in agriculture, infrastructure, and the economy; enhance tribal governance; manage natural resources; and generally advance the quality of life in tribal communities. Educational services are provided by Bureau of Indian Education—the only other agency under the assistant secretary for Indian affairs—while health care is the responsibility of the U.S. Department of Health and Human Services through its Indian Health Service.

The BIA is one of the oldest federal agencies in the U.S., with roots tracing back to the Committee on Indian Affairs established by Congress in 1775. First headed by Benjamin Franklin, the committee oversaw trade and treaty relations with various indigenous peoples, until the establishment of the Bureau of Indian Affairs by Secretary of War John C. Calhoun in 1824. The BIA gained statutory authority in 1832, and in 1849 was transferred to the newly created Department of the Interior. Until the formal adoption of its current name in 1947, the BIA was variably known as the Indian office, the Indian bureau, the Indian department, and the Indian Service.

The BIA's mission and mandate historically reflected the U.S. government's prevailing policy of forced assimilation of native peoples and the annexation of their land; beginning with the Indian Self-Determination and Education Assistance Act of 1975, the BIA has increasingly emphasized tribal self-determination and peer-to-peer relationships between tribal governments and federal government.

Between 1824 and 1977, the BIA was led by a total of 42 commissioners, of whom six were of indigenous descent. Since the creation of the position of Assistant Secretary for Indian Affairs in 1977, all thirteen occupants up to the present day have been Indigenous, including Bay Mills Indian Community's Bryan Newland, appointed and confirmed to the position in 2021. As of 2020, the majority of BIA employees are American Indian or Alaska Native, the most at any time in the agency's history.

Organization

Headquartered in the Main Interior Building in Washington, D.C., the BIA is headed by a bureau director who reports to the assistant secretary for Indian affairs. The current assistant secretary is Bryan Newland.

The BIA oversees 574 federally recognized tribes through four offices:

 Office of Indian Services: operates the BIA’s general assistance, disaster relief, Indian child welfare, tribal government, Indian self-determination, and Indian Reservation Roads Program.
 Office of Justice Services (OJS): directly operates or funds law enforcement, tribal courts, and detention facilities on federal Indian lands. OJS funded 208 law enforcement agencies, consisting of 43 BIA-operated police agencies, and 165 tribally operated agencies under contract, or compact with the OJS. The office has seven areas of activity: Criminal Investigations and Police Services, Detention/Corrections, Inspection/Internal Affairs, Tribal Law Enforcement and Special Initiatives, the Indian Police Academy, Tribal Justice Support, and Program Management. The OJS also provides oversight and technical assistance to tribal law enforcement programs when and where requested. It operates four divisions: Corrections, Drug Enforcement, the Indian Police Academy, and Law Enforcement.
 Office of Trust Services: works with tribes and individual American Indians and Alaska Natives in the management of their trust lands, assets, and resources.
 The Office of Field Operations: oversees 12 regional offices; Alaska, Great Plains, Northwest, Southern Plains, Eastern, Navajo, Pacific, Southwest, Eastern Oklahoma, Midwest, Rocky Mountain, and Western; and 83 agencies, which carry out the mission of the bureau at the tribal level.

History

Early US agencies and legislation: Intercourse Acts 

Agencies related to Native Americans originated in 1775, when the Second Continental Congress created a trio of Indian-related agencies. Benjamin Franklin and Patrick Henry were appointed among the early commissioners to negotiate treaties with Native Americans to obtain their neutrality during the American Revolutionary War.

Office of Indian Trade (1806–1822) 
In 1789, the U.S. Congress placed Native American relations within the newly formed War Department. By 1806 the Congress had created a Superintendent of Indian Trade, or "Office of Indian Trade" within the War Department, who was charged with maintaining the United States Government Fur Trade Factory System. The post was held by Thomas L. McKenney from 1816 until the abolition of the factory system in 1822.

The government licensed traders to have some control in Indian territories and gain a share of the lucrative trade.

Bureau of Indian Affairs (1824–present) 
The abolition of the factory system left a vacuum within the U.S. government regarding Native American relations. The Bureau of Indian Affairs was formed on March 11, 1824, by Secretary of War John C. Calhoun, who created the agency as a division within his department, without authorization from the United States Congress. He appointed McKenney as the first head of the office, which went by several names. McKenney preferred to call it the "Indian Office", whereas the current name was preferred by Calhoun.

The Removal Era (1830–1850) 
The BIA's goal to protect domestic and dependent nations, was reaffirmed by the 1831 court case Cherokee Nation v. Georgia. The Supreme Court originally refused to hear the case, because the Cherokee nation was not an independent state and could not litigate in the federal court. It was not until the court case Worcester v. Georgia, when Chief Justice John Marshall allowed Native American tribes to be recognized as "domestic dependent nations." These court cases set precedent for future treaties, as more Native tribes were recognized as domestic and dependent nations.

This period was encompassed by westward expansion and the removal of Native Nations. In 1833 Georgians fought for the removal of the Cherokee Nation from the state of Georgia. Despite the rulings of Worcester v. Georgia, President Jackson and John C. Calhoun created a plan for removal. The removal of the Cherokee Nation occurred in 1838 and was accompanied by the Treaty of 1846. When reparations from the treaty were unfulfilled, the Senate Committee on the Indian Affairs made the final settlement in 1850. This settlement, "supported the position of the Cherokee that the cost of maintaining the tribesman during their removal and the years upkeep after their arrival West should be paid by the federal government, and the expense of the removal agents should be paid as well."

In 1832 Congress established the position of Commissioner of Indian Affairs. In 1849 Indian Affairs was transferred to the U.S. Department of the Interior. In 1869, Ely Samuel Parker was the first Native American to be appointed as commissioner of Indian affairs.

Assimilation (1890–1930) 
One of the most controversial policies of the Bureau of Indian Affairs was the late 19th to early 20th century decision to educate native children in separate boarding schools, such as the Carlisle Indian Industrial School. With an emphasis on assimilation that prohibited them from using their indigenous languages, practices, and cultures, these schools educated to European-American culture. Another example of assimilation and Euro-American control was the Bureau of Indian Affairs tribal police force. This was designed by its agents  to decrease the power of American Indian leaders.

Reform and reorganization (mid to late 20th century) 

The bureau was renamed from Office of Indian Affairs to Bureau of Indian Affairs in 1947.

With the rise of American Indian activism in the 1960s and 1970s and increasing demands for enforcement of treaty rights and sovereignty, the 1970s were a particularly turbulent period of BIA history. The rise of activist groups such as the American Indian Movement (AIM) worried the U.S. government; the FBI responded both overtly and covertly (by creating COINTELPRO and other programs) to suppress possible uprisings among native peoples.

As a branch of the U.S. government with personnel on Indian reservations, BIA police were involved in political actions such as:

The occupation of BIA headquarters in Washington, D.C., in 1972: On November 3, 1972, a group of around 500 American Indians with the AIM took over the BIA building, the culmination of their Trail of Broken Treaties walk. They intended to bring attention to American Indian issues, including their demands for renewed negotiation of treaties, enforcement of treaty rights and improvement in living standards. They occupied the Department of Interior headquarters from November 3 to 9, 1972. 
Feeling the government was ignoring them, the protesters vandalized the building. After a week, the protesters left, having caused $700,000 in damages. Many records were lost, destroyed or stolen, including irreplaceable treaties, deeds, and water rights records, which some Indian officials said could set the tribes back 50 to 100 years.
 The Wounded Knee Incident of 1973, where activists at the Pine Ridge Indian Reservation occupied land for more than two months.
 The 1975 Pine Ridge shootout (for which Leonard Peltier was convicted of killing two FBI agents).

The BIA was implicated in supporting controversial tribal presidents, notably Dick Wilson, who was charged with being authoritarian; using tribal funds for a private paramilitary force, the Guardians of the Oglala Nation (or "GOON squad"), which he employed against opponents; intimidation of voters in the 1974 election; misappropriation of funds, and other misdeeds. Many native peoples continue to oppose policies of the BIA.  In particular, problems in enforcing treaties, handling records and trust land incomes were disputed.

21st century 
In 2002 the United States Congress and Bureau of Indian Affairs met to discuss the bill S.1392, which established procedures for the Bureau of Indians Affairs of the Department of Interior, with respect to the tribal recognition. Bill S. 1393 was also discussed, as it ensured full and fair participation in decision making processes at the Bureau of Indian Affairs via grants. Both bills addressed what services, limitations, obligations, and responsibilities a federally recognized tribe possessed. The bills excluded any splinter groups, political factions, and any groups formed after December 31, 2002.

In 2013 the Bureau was greatly affected by sequestration funding cuts of $800 million, which particularly affected the already-underfunded Indian Health Service.

Legal issues

Employee overtime
The Bureau of Indian Affairs has been sued four times in class action overtime lawsuits brought by the Federation of Indian Service Employees, a union which represents the federal civilian employees of the Bureau of Indian Affairs, the Bureau of Indian Education, the assistant secretary of Indian affairs and the Office of the Special Trustee for Indian Affairs.  The grievances allege widespread violations of the Fair Labor Standards Act and claim tens of millions of dollars in damages.

Trust assets
Cobell vs. Salazar, a major class action case related to trust lands, was settled in December 2009. The suit was filed against the U.S. Department of Interior, of which the BIA is a part. A major responsibility has been the management of the Indian trust accounts. This was a class-action lawsuit regarding the federal government's management and accounting of more than 300,000 individual American Indian and Alaska Native trust accounts. A settlement fund totaling $3.4 billion is to be distributed to class members. This is to compensate for claims that prior U.S. officials had mismanaged the administration of Indian trust assets. In addition, the settlement establishes a $2 billion fund enabling federally recognized tribes to voluntarily buy back and consolidate fractionated land interests.

Mission
The bureau is currently trying to evolve from a supervisory to an advisory role. However, this has been a difficult task as the BIA is known by many Indians as playing a police role in which the U.S. government historically dictated to tribes and their members what they could and could not do in accordance with treaties signed by both.

Commissioners and assistant secretaries
Commissioners and assistant secretaries of Indian Affairs include:

Heads of the Bureau of Indian Affairs

 1822–1824 William Clark
 1824–1830 Thomas L. McKenney
 1830–1831 Samuel S. Hamilton
 2002–2004 Terry Virden
 2004–2005 Brian Pogue
 2005–2007 Patrick Rasdale
 2007–2010 Jerold L. Gidner
 2010–2016 Michael S. Black
 2016–2017 Weldon Loudermilk
 2017–2018 Bryan C. Rice

 2018–present Darryl LaCounte

Commissioners of Indian Affairs

 1832–1836 Elbert Herring
 1836–1838 Carey A. Harris
 1838–1845 Thomas Hartley Crawford
 1845–1849 William Medill
 1849–1850 Orlando Brown
 1850–1853 Luke Lea
 1853–1857 George Washington Manypenny
 1857–1858 James W. Denver
 1858 Charles E. Mix
 1858–1859 James W. Denver
 1859–1861 Alfred B. Greenwood
 1861–1865 William P. Dole
 1865–1866 Dennis N. Cooley
 1866–1867 Lewis V. Bogy
 1867–1869 Nathaniel G. Taylor
 1869–1871 Ely S. Parker
 1871–1872 Francis A. Walker
 1873–1875 Edward Parmelee Smith
 1875–1877 John Q. Smith
 1877–1880 Ezra A. Hayt
 1880–1881 Rowland E. Trowbridge
 1881–1885 Hiram Price
 1885–1888 John D. C. Atkins
 1888–1889 John H. Oberly
 1889–1893 Thomas Jefferson Morgan
 1893–1897 Daniel M. Browning
 1897–1904 William Arthur Jones
 1904–1909 Francis E. Leupp
 1909–1913 Robert G. Valentine
 1913–1921 Cato Sells
 1921–1929 Charles H. Burke
 1929–1933 Charles J. Rhoads
 1933–1945 John Collier
 1945–1948 William A. Brophy
 1948–1949 William R. Zimmerman (acting)
 1949–1950 John R. Nichols
 1950–1953 Dillon S. Myer
 1953–1961 Glenn L. Emmons
 1961 John O. Crow (acting)
 1961–1966 Philleo Nash
 1966–1969 Robert L. Bennett
 1969–1972  Louis R. Bruce
 1973–1976 Morris Thompson
 1976–1977 Dr. Benjamin Reifel

Assistant Secretaries of the Interior for Indian Affairs

 1977–1978 Forrest Gerard
 1979–1981 William E. Hallett
 1981–1984 Kenneth L. Smith
 1985–1989 Ross Swimmer
 1989–1993 Eddie Frank Brown
 1993–1997 Ada E. Deer
 1997–2001 Kevin Gover
 2001 James H. McDivitt (acting)
 2001–2003 Neal A. McCaleb
 2003–2004 Aurene M. Martin (acting)
 2004–2005 Dave Anderson
 2005–2007 Jim Cason (acting)
 2007–2008 Carl J. Artman
 2008–2009 George T. Skibine (acting)
 2009–2012 Larry Echo Hawk
 2012 Donald "Del" Laverdure (acting)
 2012–2015 Kevin K. Washburn
 2016–2017 Lawrence S. Roberts (acting)
 2017 Michael S. Black (acting)
 2017–2018 John Tahsuda (acting)
 2018–2021 Tara Sweeney
 2021–present Bryan Newland

Assistant to the Secretary for Indian Affairs

 February 7, 1973 – December 4, 1973 Marvin L. Franklin

See also

 Title 25 of the Code of Federal Regulations
 Aboriginal Affairs and Northern Development Canada
 Administration for Native Americans
 American Indian Movement
 British Indian Department
 Bureau of Indian Affairs Police
 Confederate States Bureau of Indian Affairs
 Indian agent
 Indian Claims Commission
 Indian Department
 Indian reservations
 National Indian Gaming Commission
 Outline of United States federal Indian law and policy
 United States federal recognition of Native Hawaiians

References

Sources
 Belko, William S.  "'John C. Calhoun and the Creation of the Bureau of Indian Affairs: An Essay on Political Rivalry, Ideology, and Policymaking in the Early Republic," South Carolina Historical Magazine 2004 105(3): 170–97. 
 Cahill, Cathleen D. Federal Fathers and Mothers: A Social History of the United States Indian Service, 1869–1933 (U of North Carolina Press, 2011) 368 pp. online review
 Deloria, Jr., Vine, and David E. Wilkins, Tribes, Treaties, & Constitutional Tribulations (Austin, 1999)
Jackson, Helen H.  A Century of Dishonor: A Sketch of the U. S. Government's Dealings with Some of the Indian Tribes (1881) online edition
Leupp, F. E. The Indian and His Problem (1910) online edition
Meriam, Lewis, et al., The Problem of Indian Administration, Studies in Administration, 17 (Baltimore, 1928)
 Pevar, Stephen L. The Rights of Indians and Tribes (Carbondale, 2002)
Prucha, Francis P. Atlas of American Indian Affairs (Lincoln, 1990)
Prucha, Francis P. The Great Father: The United States Government and the American Indians (Abridged Edition 1986)  excerpt and text search
 Schmeckebier, L. F. Office of Indian Affairs: History, Activities, and Organization,  Service Monograh 48 (Baltimore 1927)
Sutton, I. "Indian Country and the Law: Land Tenure, Tribal Sovereignty, and the States," ch. 36 in Law in the Western United States,  ed. G. M. Bakken (Norman, 2000)

Primary sources
Francis P. Prucha, ed. Documents of United States Indian Policy (3rd ed. 2000) excerpt and text search

Further reading

External links

 
 Bureau of Indian Affairs in the Federal Register
A History of the Bureau of Indian Affairs
Background information about the Cobell Litigation
Indian Schools papers, 1929–1945, in the Southwest Collection/Special Collections Library at Texas Tech University
Bureau of Indian Affairs-collection of letters at Texas Tech University
Broken Promises: Evaluating the Native American Health Care System by the U.S. Commission on Civil Rights, September 2004
 Bureau of Indian Affairs Indian Relocation Records  at Newberry Library
 Bureau of Indian Affairs correspondence, MSS SC 785 at L. Tom Perry Special Collections, Harold B. Lee Library, Brigham Young University

 
Indigenous affairs ministries
Organizations based in Washington, D.C.
Government agencies established in 1824
United States public land law